LBQ may refer to:

 IATA code for Lambaréné Airport
 LBQ, a variation of LGB in She's in London
 lbq, ISO code for the Wampar language
 LBQ Ltd, a stakeholder in the development of The Shard